Leptolalax maurus is a frog species in the family Megophryidae. It is endemic to Borneo where it is only known from its type locality, Mount Kinabalu in Sabah, Malaysia. Its natural habitats are tropical moist montane forests and rivers. It is becoming rare due to habitat loss.

References

maurus
Amphibians of Malaysia
Endemic fauna of Malaysia
Endemic fauna of Borneo
Amphibians described in 1997
Taxonomy articles created by Polbot
Taxobox binomials not recognized by IUCN
Amphibians of Borneo